Come What May may refer to:

Film 
 Come What May (2015 film), a French historical drama

Music 
Come What May (album), a 2019 album by Joshua Redman
Come What(ever) May, a 2006 album by Stone Sour
"Come What May" (1952 song), a song popularized by Patti Page
"Come What May", a song by Patti LaBelle from the 1979 album It's Alright with Me
"Come What May" (2001 song), a song popularized by Ewan McGregor and Nicole Kidman, from the movie Moulin Rouge!
"Come What May", a song by Air Supply from the 1982 album Now and Forever
"Come What May", an English language version of "Après toi", a 1972 song by Vicky Leandros
Come What May (band), an American rock band